Luella Toledo Costales is an American politician who served as a Democratic member of the Hawaiʻi House of Representatives. She was appointed to represent the 39th district after incumbent Representative Ty Cullen resigned in February 2022.

Early life and education
Costales was born in Los Angeles and moved to Hawaiʻi in 1992 after her children were born. She graduated from the University of California San Diego with a Bachelor of Arts in Communication/Visual Arts and minors in Literature/Writing and Sociology.

Career
Costales previously served as executive director of the Hawaiʻi Farm Bureau Federation and the Filipino Community Center in Waipahu. She was previously the director of fund development for the Rehabilitation Hospital of the Pacific and currently works as the community and resource manager for the Oahu Economic Development Board.

Costales was appointed to the Honolulu Police Commission in 2012 by Mayor Peter Carlisle. She resigned in 2017 in protest over a lack of gender, ethnic, and work background diversity on a consultant-selected panel reviewing candidates for a new police chief to replace Louis Kealoha.

Hawaiʻi House of Representatives
Governor David Ige appointed Costales to fill the 39th district seat left vacant after incumbent Representative Ty Cullen resigned due to pleading guilty to federal bribery charges. She was sworn in on March 11, 2022. Costales did not run for a full term in the 2022 Hawaiʻi House of Representatives election, and she was succeeded by Republican Elijah Pierick.

Costales had previously run for the 36th district in 2014, losing the Democratic primary to former representative Marilyn Lee who went on to lose to incumbent Republican Beth Fukumoto.

Electoral history

References

External links
Official page at the Hawaii State Legislature

Year of birth missing (living people)
Living people
University of California, San Diego alumni
Hawaii politicians of Filipino descent
Democratic Party members of the Hawaii House of Representatives
People from Los Angeles
21st-century American politicians
American women of Filipino descent in politics
American politicians of Filipino descent
Women state legislators in Hawaii
Asian-American people in Hawaii politics
21st-century American women politicians